I Am a Stalker is a British Netflix original true crime docuseries directed by Alex Nikolic-Dunlop. It features a series of interviews with convicted stalkers and their survivors who share their first-hand accounts of what happened. The series was released on October 28, 2022.

Episodes

References

External links 

2022 British television series debuts
2022 British television series endings
2022 documentary films
2020s British documentary television series
2020s British television miniseries
English-language Netflix original programming
Netflix original documentary television series
Television series based on actual events
Documentaries about crime